Dolores "Lola" Moreira Fraschini (born 16 February 1999 in Montevideo) is a Uruguayan sailor who races the Laser Radial. She competed at the 2020 Summer Olympics in Tokyo 2021, in Laser Radial.

Career 
In 2014, she competed in, and was Uruguay's flagbearer at the Summer Youth Olympics. She won the last race and finished 9th in the Girls' Byte CII class.

In July 2015, she was again named Uruguay's flagbearer, but now for the 2015 Pan American Games opening ceremony, after track and field athlete Déborah Rodríguez could not arrive on time to Toronto due to flight problems.

In 2016, she was for a third time named Uruguay's flagbearer for the 2016 Summer Olympics. She placed 25th in the women's Laser Radial competition.

Results
 2014 Youth Olympic Games: 9th
 2015 Pan American Games: 
 2014 ISAF Sailing World Championships: 31st
 2014 ISAF Youth Sailing World Championships: 10th

Notes

References

External links
 
 
 
 

1999 births
Living people
Uruguayan female sailors (sport)
Olympic sailors of Uruguay
Sailors at the 2014 Summer Youth Olympics
Sailors at the 2016 Summer Olympics – Laser Radial
Sailors at the 2020 Summer Olympics – Laser Radial
Pan American Games silver medalists for Uruguay
Pan American Games medalists in sailing
Sailors at the 2015 Pan American Games
Sportspeople from Montevideo
Medalists at the 2015 Pan American Games
21st-century Uruguayan women